Felix Akinbuluma
was an Anglican bishop in Nigeria: he was Bishop of Irele-Eseodo until his death at the age of 59 in 2018.

He was consecrated in 2009 as the founding Bishop of Irele-Eseodo in the Anglican Province of Ondo.

Notes

2018 deaths
Anglican bishops of Irele-Eseodo
21st-century Anglican bishops in Nigeria
Year of birth missing